Kiss My Lips is the eighth Korean-language studio album (seventeenth overall) by 
South Korean singer BoA. It was released digitally on May 12, 2015, and physically a day later by SM Entertainment, and distributed by KT Music. The album features twelve tracks in total, including two singles; "Who Are You" and the title track. The self-produced record (for celebrating the fifteenth anniversary of BoA's debut) is her first Korean full-length release since Only One (2012).

Release and promotion
On May 8, the album's track listing was revealed online, and an image teaser video for the lead single came out via SM Entertainment's official YouTube channel the following day. Commercials for the album aired from May 11 until 17. On May 12, the whole album was released with an official music video for the title track.

BoA began promoting her comeback album on various music programs, starting on Music Bank aired on May 15, 2015. Along with the lead single, she performed "Fox" on Music Bank, "Green Light" on Show! Music Core, and "Smash" on Inkigayo. On KBS's You Hee-yeol's Sketchbook, BoA performed the album's two lead singles and "Double Jack", along with her previous hits "My Name" and "No. 1". She also covered "Billie Jean" by Michael Jackson, who the singer stated was particularly her role model. Promotions for the album was wrapped up by BoA's performance on Inkigayo aired on May 31, 2015.

Singles

"Who Are You"
The album's pre-release single "Who Are You", written by BoA herself, is an electronic dance-pop tune with sounds of guitar and bass. Featuring a rap by Gaeko from hip-hop twosome Dynamic Duo, the lyrics of the self-penned song expresses excitement of a man and woman until meeting each other on a blind date. The single was released on May 6, 2015, with its accompanying music video. 

The singer's labelmate Sehun (from Exo) and actress Kim Hyun-ji co-starred in the music video as blind date partners. The music video shows varied places and props, and also sensory images mixing reality and fantasy through a lot of CG-based special effects. Commercially, "Who Are You" reached number three on the Gaon Digital Chart, and has sold over 566,000 digital copies in South Korea.

"Kiss My Lips"
The self-composed title track "Kiss My Lips" is a minimal pop song incorporated with unique synthesizer riffs and sound. Emphasizing her deep voice, BoA's vocals redouble the single's dreamlike atmosphere. In the song's lyrics, the speaker provocatively urges her counterpart not to hesitate about coming up to her.

The single was released on May 12, 2015, the same day as the album's release. Its corresponding music video was directed by the singer's elder brother Kwon Soon-wook, who also directed the video for the album's pre-release track. Commercially, "Kiss My Lips" peaked at number eighteen on the Gaon Digital Chart and has sold nearly 128,000 digital copies domestically.

Reception
Upon its release, Kiss My Lips debuted at number five on the Gaon Weekly Albums Chart. The album also entered Billboards World Albums Chart on the issue date of May 30, 2015, debuting at number six. It sold 15,234 copies in South Korea and over 1,000 copies in Japan by the end of the year.

Track listing

Notes
 According to the album's booklet, the original title of track 1 was "Soft Lips".

Charts

Weekly charts

Monthly charts

Year-end charts

Release history

See also
 List of K-pop on the Billboard charts

Footnotes

References

External links
 
 
 
 
 BoA's official website

2015 albums
Albums produced by the Underdogs (production team)
BoA albums
Korean-language albums
SM Entertainment albums